Ishmail Foday Kamara (born 29 October 1987) is an association football player from Sierra Leone. He has gained five international caps for national football team.

Career
Kamara's career has taken him all over the world, playing for sides in countries such as Sweden, Thailand, USA and Ivory Coast. In August 2010, he joined Isthmian League Premier Division club Margate from Motala AIF, at Margate he joined up with Sierra Leone teammate John Keister.

In September 2010 Kamara had a short trial at Leeds United Kamara signed for Isthmian League South Division side Dulwich Hamlet making his debut on 16 November 2011 against Walton and Hersham. He finished the season with 15 goals in 23 league games.

In October 2012, Kamara signed for Barnet, after trials with other Football League clubs including Portsmouth and Watford. He made his debut as an 80th-minute substitute for Oliver Lee against Fleetwood Town, but suffered a dislocated shoulder just minutes after coming on which kept him out until towards the end of the season. This was the only game he played for the senior team in the 2012/13 season, as well as playing a handful of games for the under-21 side. He was then released at the end of the season. Kamara joined Conference Premier side Dartford in December 2013. After the end of the 2013–14 season, he left Dartford, and subsequently joined Bishop's Stortford at the start of the 2014–15 season.

International career
Kamara has five caps for the Sierra Leone national side.

Career statistics

Club

International

References

External links

1987 births
Living people
Sierra Leonean footballers
Sierra Leone international footballers
Haringey Borough F.C. players
Canvey Island F.C. players
Bishop's Stortford F.C. players
Dartford F.C. players
VCD Athletic F.C. players
Barnet F.C. players
Dulwich Hamlet F.C. players
Maidenhead United F.C. players
Margate F.C. players
Virginia Beach Mariners players
Real Maryland F.C. players
Northern Virginia Royals players
Expatriate footballers in England
Expatriate footballers in Thailand
Expatriate footballers in Sweden
Expatriate soccer players in the United States
English Football League players
National League (English football) players
Isthmian League players
USL First Division players
USL League Two players
USL Second Division players
Sierra Leonean expatriate sportspeople in Sweden
Association football forwards